Aritzo is a comune (municipality) in the Province of Nuoro in the Italian region Sardinia, located about  north of Cagliari and about  southwest of Nuoro.  

Aritzo borders the following municipalities: Arzana, Belvì, Desulo, Gadoni, Laconi, Meana Sardo, and Seulo.

References

Cities and towns in Sardinia
Articles which contain graphical timelines